Carry On is the twelfth album by Crosby, Stills & Nash, issued on Atlantic Records in 1991, generally for the European and Australian markets. It is a two-disc sampler of their four-disc box set, CSN, released two months previously in the United States and the United Kingdom. It features material spanning 1968 through 1990 from their catalogue of recordings as a group in addition to selections from Crosby & Nash, Manassas, and their individual solo albums. It was reissued on 30 June 1998 on the WEA International record label. This compilation should not be confused with the Stephen Stills box set of the same name released in 2013.

Content
Where the box set is a more comprehensive overview, this one focuses on previously unreleased tracks, hits, and favorites. Of its 36 tracks, 13 had been unreleased previously, and nine contain all of the group's Top 40 hits from the Billboard Hot 100. The group's some-time partner Neil Young appears on eight tracks, including his own songs "Helpless" and "Ohio".  The previously-unreleased material includes studio recordings by the full quartet of "Helplessly Hoping" (originally released by the trio), "Taken at All" (originally by Crosby & Nash), and "The Lee Shore" (previously available only live).  The set also includes both the demo of "You Don't Have to Cry", the first recording they made as Crosby, Stills & Nash, and the three tracks from their most recent studio album as of 1991 that are also on the box set.
 
The original recordings were produced David Crosby, Stephen Stills, Graham Nash, and Neil Young, with assistance from Howard Albert, Ron Albert, Stanley Johnston, and Paul Rothchild. Audio engineers on the original recordings include Stephen Barncard, Larry Cox, Russ Gary, Don Gooch, Steve Gursky, Bill Halverson, David Hassinger, Andy Johns, and Jim Mitchell. The original masters were recorded at the following studios: Devonshire Sound Studio, Wally Heider Studios, The Record Plant, Rudy Recorders, the Sound Lab, Sunset Sound, Sunwest Studio, and Village Recorders in Los Angeles; United Studio in Hollywood; The Record Plant in New York City; Wally Heider Studios, His Master's Wheels, and Rudy Recorders in San Francisco; Criteria Sound Studios in Miami; Island Studios in London; and Stephen Stills' late 1960s home in Laurel Canyon. The selections were compiled for this set by Crosby, Stills, Nash, Gerry Tolman, and Yves Beauvais, with additional research by Joel Bernstein.

Track listing
An asterisk (*) indicates a live recording, two asterisks (**) a previously unreleased mix, (†) a previously unreleased version, and (‡) a previously unreleased song.

Disc one

Disc two

Personnel
 David Crosby – vocals, guitars, keyboards, string arrangements
 Stephen Stills – vocals, guitars, keyboards, bass, percussion
 Graham Nash – vocals, guitars, keyboards, percussion, string arrangements
 Neil Young – vocals, guitars, harmonica, keyboards
 Joel Bernstein, Danny Kortchmar, Michael Landau, David Lindley, Michael Stergis, James Taylor – guitars
 Jerry Garcia  – pedal steel guitar
 John Sebastian – harmonica, backing vocals
 Joe Vitale – drums, percussion, keyboards, synthesizers, vibraphone, flute
 Richard T. Bear, Joel Bernstein, Craig Doerge, Mike Finnigan, Paul Harris, James Newton Howard – keyboards
 Jack Casady, Tim Drummond, Bob Glaub, Bruce Palmer, George "Chocolate" Perry, Greg Reeves, Calvin "Fuzzy" Samuels, Leland Sklar – bass
 John Barbata, Russ Kunkel, Dallas Taylor – drums
 Michael Fisher, Joe Lala, Efrain Toro, Jeff Whittaker – percussion
  Joel Bernstein, Rita Coolidge, Venetta Fields, Priscilla Jones, Clydie King, Sherlie Matthews, Dorothy Morrison, Timothy B. Schmit – backing vocals
 Cyrus Faryar – bouzouki
 Wayne Goodwin – fiddle
 Branford Marsalis – soprano saxophone
 Jimmie Haskell, Mike Lewis, Sid Sharp – string arrangements
 Tony Beard – drum programming

Production personnel
 Graham Nash, Gerry Tolman – producers
 Stephen Barncard at Sunset Sound – 1991 mixes for unreleased material
 Joe Gastwirt, John Modells at Ocean View Digital – digital remastering, July and August 1991
 Joe Gastwirt at Ocean View Digital and John Nowland at Redwood Digital, San Francisco – analog-to-digital tape transfer, June and July 1991
 Joe Gastwirt, John Nowland, Joel Bernstein – tape restoration

Certifications

References

Crosby, Stills, Nash & Young compilation albums
1991 compilation albums
Atlantic Records compilation albums
Albums produced by Graham Nash